HC Motor Zaporizhzhia was a Ukrainian women's handball team from Zaporizhzhia.

History
Following the dissolution of the Soviet Union Motor Zaporizhzhia replaced Spartak Kyiv as the hegemonical powerhouse in the new Ukrainian Superleague winning 14 championships in 17 years, including an 8-year winning streak in the 2000s. It also won the 2001 Cup Winners' Cup, beating Nordstrand IF in the final. Its best performance in other EHF competitions was reaching the Champions League's quarterfinals in 1998 and 2002 and the EHF Cup's semifinals in 2003 and 2006.

In 2009, the club lost its sponsorship and was renamed ZDIA Zaporizhzhia. Two years later it was dissolved after going bankrupt.

Honours
 EHF Cup Winners' Cup: 1
Champion: 2000/2001
Bronze: 1992/1993
 EHF European League: 0
Bronze: 2002/2003, 2005/2006
 Ukrainian Super League: 14
Champion: 1993, 1994, 1995, 1997, 1998, 1999, 2001, 2002, 2003, 2004, 2005, 2006, 2007, 2008
Silver: 1992, 1996, 2000, 2009
 Ukrainian Women's Handball Cup: 1
Champion: 2000

References

Sport in Zaporizhzhia
Defunct handball clubs in Ukraine
Sports clubs established in 1989
Sports clubs disestablished in 2011
1989 establishments in Ukraine
2011 disestablishments in Ukraine
Motor Sich